Ameristar may refer to:
 Ameristar Air Cargo, an American passenger and cargo airline based in Dallas, Texas, US
 Ameristar Casinos, a former casino operator based in Paradise, Nevada